Pavone Canavese Castle ( is a castle located in Pavone Canavese, Piedmont, Italy.

History 
The castle was originally built between the 9th and the 11th century. In 1888, the castle started undergoing renovation works under the direction of architect Alfredo d'Andrade, which were later completed, after his death, by his son Ruy d'Andrade.

In 1981, the castle was declared a national monument.

Gallery

References

External links

Official Website

Castles in Piedmont